The Kashmere Gate is a Delhi Metro station in Delhi, on the Red Line,  Yellow Line and Violet Line. It is a transfer station between the Red Line on the highest upper level, the Yellow Line  on the lowest underground level and Violet Line on the parallel underground level.
It is the busiest metro station in India. It was named on 25 December 2002. During peak hours, it serves as an alternate Northern Terminus for the yellow line along with Vishwa Vidyalaya.

The giant station has over 6 floors. It has facilities like restaurants, fast food centres, McDonald's, Burger King, water vending machines, 3 toilet complexes, over 35 escalators, Ticket vending machines etc.

Phase III connections
Under the Delhi Metro Phase III plan, the Violet Line was extended from its current terminus to meet the Yellow and Red Lines at Kashmere Gate station. This provided an alternative route between Central Secretariat and Kashmere Gate, alleviating crowds on the heavily used Yellow Line.
It was inaugurated on 28 May 2017 by the then Union minister Sh. Venkaiah Naidu .

See also
Rajiv Chowk metro station
Transport in Delhi

References

External links

 Delhi Metro Rail Corporation Ltd. (Official site)
 Delhi Metro Annual Reports

Delhi Metro stations
Railway stations opened in 2002
2002 establishments in Delhi
Railway stations in North Delhi district